Brazil competed at the 2017 Winter Universiade in Almaty, Kazakhstan. Brazil sent only one athlete, Bruna Moura in cross-country skiing.

Cross-country skiing

References

Winter Universidade
Brazil at the Winter Universiade
Nations at the 2017 Winter Universiade